Višelnica is a settlement in the Municipality of Gorje in the Upper Carniola region of Slovenia.

References

External links
Višelnica at Geopedia

Populated places in the Municipality of Gorje